Mitchell Whitfield (born September 8, 1964) is an American actor. He is best known for his roles as Barry Farber in Friends (1994-2000), Dr. Bruce Hampton in Minor Adjustments (1995-1996), and Stan Rothenstein in My Cousin Vinny (1992).

Life and career
Whitfield was born in Brooklyn, New York. He guest starred in several episodes of Friends as Dr. Barry Farber, Rachel Green's orthodontist ex-fiancé, whom Rachel left at the altar on their wedding day. He also appeared in Dharma & Greg, Murder, She Wrote, Diagnosis Murder, CSI: Crime Scene Investigation, and Curb Your Enthusiasm. In the 1992 film My Cousin Vinny, Whitfield starred as Stan Rothenstein, opposite Ralph Macchio. He also appeared in an episode of The Suite Life of Zack & Cody.

As a voice actor, Whitfield voiced Phobos on W.I.T.C.H. and Donatello in the TMNT film.

In Dogfight, he played Benjamin, a Marine friend of Eddie Birdlace. As of 2015, Whitfield does the voice of Fixit on Transformers: Robots in Disguise.

Filmography
Film
 The First Turn-On! (1983) - Bedwet Micky
 Reversal of Fortune (1990) - Curly
 Dogfight (1991) - Benjamin
 My Cousin Vinny (1992) - Stan Rothenstein
 Sgt. Bilko (1996) - Pfc. Mickey Zimmerman
 I Love You, Don't Touch Me! (1997) - Ben
 A Match Made in Heaven (1997, TV Movie) - Gordon Rosner
 Best Men (1997) - Sol Jacobs
 The Fanatics (1997) - Benny Pinser
 Critics and Other Freaks (1997) - Casting Agent
 Lost & Found (1999) - Mark Gildewell
 Seal with a Kiss (1999, TV Movie) - Larry
 Flies on Cupid (2000) - Steven Hayes
 Amy's Orgasm (2001) - Don
 The Memory Thief (2007) - Tom
 TMNT (2007) - Donatello (voice)
 Dylan Dog: Dead of Night (2010) - Cecil

Television
 Murder, She Wrote (1992, TV Series) - Teddy Cardoza
 Blossom (1993, TV Series) - Larry Levin
 The Angry Beavers (1994, TV Series) - Norbert Foster Beaver (voice)
 The George Carlin Show (1994, TV Series) - Brian
 Diagnosis: Murder (1994–1995, TV Series) - Eddie Clark / Arnold Baskin
 Friends (1994-2000 (6 Episodes), TV Series) - Barry Farber
 Double Rush (1995, TV Series) - Michael
 Minor Adjustments (1995–1996, TV Series) - Dr. Bruce Hampton
 Perversions of Science (1997, TV Series) - Matt Solomon
 Head over Heels (1997, TV Series) - Warren Baldwin
 Family Law (2000, TV Series) - Ian Packard
 Dharma and Greg (2000, TV Series) - Bob
 Buzz Lightyear of Star Command (2000, TV Series) - Klerm (voice)
 CSI: Crime Scene Investigation (2001, TV Series) - Cameron Nelson
 Curb Your Enthusiasm (2001, TV Series) - Becky's Fiancé
 W.I.T.C.H. (2004–2006, TV Series) - Phobos / Sandpit (voices)
 Hellboy: Sword of Storms (2006, TV Movie) - Russell Thorn (voice)
 The Suite Life of Zack & Cody (2007, TV Series) - Mr. Blaine
 Winx Club (2007–2014, TV Series) - Professor Palladium (voice)
 Green Lantern: Emerald Knights (2011) - Avra (voice)
 Doc McStuffins (2012, TV Series) - Oooey Gablooey (voice)
 The Legend of Korra (2014, TV Series) - Gun (voice)
 Sofia the First (2014–2017, TV Series) - Boo / Greylock (voices)
 Transformers: Robots in Disguise (2014-2017, TV Series) - Fixit (voice)
 Goldie & Bear (2015–2018, TV Series) - Humpty Dumpty / Demi / Woodsman (voices) singing vocals of Sir Kenneth in episode 11
 Vampirina (2017–2021, TV Series short) - Demi (voice)

Video games
 24: The Game (2006)
 TMNT (2007) - Donatello
 Skylanders: Trap Team'' (2014) - Bruiser Cruiser

References

External links 
 Official website
 

1964 births
Living people
20th-century American male actors
21st-century American male actors
American male film actors
American male television actors
American male voice actors
Male actors from New York (state)
People from Brooklyn